(born 1964) is a Japanese writer. She has won the Subaru Literary Newcomer Prize, the Naoki Prize, and the Shibata Renzaburo Prize.

Biography
Born in 1964 in Tokyo, Japan, Murayama graduated from Rikkyo University and majored in Japanese literature. Before becoming a writer she worked at as a real-estate agent and a teacher at a cram school. 

In 1993 her first novel, won the Subaru Literary Newcomer Prize in Japan. After garnering the prize, she produced many other novels: Wild Winds, Bad Kids, Delicious Coffee Series, among others. The Angel's Egg was adapted to film in 2006 as The Angel's Egg, directed by Shin Togashi. Double Fantasy was adapted into a 2018 Wowow television drama starring Asami Mizukawa.

Yuka Murayama lives in Chiba Prefecture near Tokyo.

Recognition
 1993 6th Subaru Literary Newcomer Prize
 2003 129th Naoki Prize (2003上)
 2009 4th Chuokoron Literary Prize
 2009 22nd Shibata Renzaburo Prize

Bibliography
 , Shueisha, 1994, 
 , Bungeishunjū, 2003, 
 , Bungeishunjū, 2009,

References

External links 
J'Lit | Authors : Yuka Murayama | Books from Japan

1964 births
Living people
People from Tokyo
20th-century Japanese novelists
21st-century Japanese novelists
Rikkyo University alumni
Japanese women novelists
21st-century Japanese women writers
20th-century Japanese women writers